The Audi Cup is a biennial two-day pre-season friendly football tournament that features four teams, hosted by the German club Bayern Munich, and is staged at the Allianz Arena in Munich, Germany. It is held on odd years since 2009, opposite the FIFA World Cup and UEFA Euro, before the start of the Bundesliga season as well.

History
The first Audi Cup in 2009 was organised and promoted by car manufacturer Audi AG to celebrate their 100th year of trading, and was won by hosts Bayern Munich. It was held in place of the Franz Beckenbauer Cup, which took place in 2007, 2008 and 2010. The second Audi Cup took place in 2011 and was won by Barcelona of Spain. Bayern Munich won the next two Audi Cups, beating Manchester City 2–1 in the 2013 final and Real Madrid 1–0 in 2015. Atlético Madrid claimed the title in 2017 with a victory on penalties after a 1–1 draw with Liverpool, before Tottenham Hotspur also required penalties against Bayern Munich to win their first Audi Cup in 2019.

From 2016 to 2018, as part of the International Champions Cup, two of Bayern Munich's matches each year were also called the Audi Football Summit. The matches were:

Editions

Performance by team
The Audi Cup is hosted by Bayern Munich, who have participated in the competition all six times, and excluding them, Milan has participated in the most Audi Cup tournaments, with four. Barcelona were invited in 2011 and won the cup in their only participation, as did Atlético Madrid in their sole outing in 2017.

Performance by country

Top goalscorers

See also
Uli Hoeneß Cup

External links

 
2009 establishments in Germany
Audi
FC Bayern Munich
German football friendly trophies
Recurring sporting events established in 2009